César Antonio Molina Sánchez (born 14 September 1952) is a Spanish writer, translator, university professor, cultural manager and politician. He served as Minister of Culture of Spain from July 2007 until April 2009.

References

1952 births
Living people
University of Santiago de Compostela alumni
Government ministers of Spain
21st-century Spanish politicians
Culture ministers of Spain